Namkhain Tsend-Ayuush (born 26 February 1945) is a Mongolian boxer. He competed in the men's light middleweight event at the 1972 Summer Olympics.

References

External links
 

1945 births
Living people
Mongolian male boxers
Olympic boxers of Mongolia
Boxers at the 1972 Summer Olympics
Place of birth missing (living people)
Light-middleweight boxers
20th-century Mongolian people